is a Japanese publishing company headquartered in Chiyoda, Tokyo. It was founded by Teio Akita on 10 August 1948. As of 2020, the company's president is Shigeru Higuchi.

Magazines

Male-oriented manga magazines

Shōnen magazines
  – Bimonthly (the 12th of month)
  – Monthly (the 6th of month)
  – Weekly (each Thursday)
  – Weekly web comics (Tuesday and Thursday)
Defunct:

 Bōken Ō - monthly from 1949-1983
 Manga Ō

Seinen magazines
  – Monthly (the 19th of month)
  – Bimonthly (the 5th of month), defunct
  – Monthly (the 1st of every month)
  – Semimonthly (each 2nd and 4th Thursday of the month)
  – Semimonthly (each 2nd and 4th Tuesday of the month)
  – Bimonthly (the 3rd Monday of month)

Female-oriented manga magazines
  – Monthly (the sixth of every month)
  – defunct
  – Monthly (the first of every month, digital only)
  – the sixth of every month
  – the twenty-fourth of every odd month
  – the twenty-sixth of every month
  – Monthly (the third of every month)
  – Quarterly
  – the sixth of every odd month
  – the sixth of every even month
  – the twenty-eighth of every even month
  – defunct

Other magazines
  – defunct
 J-TOON – Webtoons

See also

 List of manga published by Akita Shoten

References

External links

  
 

 
Book publishing companies in Tokyo
Comic book publishing companies in Tokyo
Chiyoda, Tokyo
Japanese companies established in 1948
Magazine publishing companies in Tokyo
Manga distributors
Publishing companies established in 1948